Robert Cecil Palmer Secondary School, (commonly, R.C. Palmer Secondary School, RCPSS, RCP, and Palmer Secondary School) is a public, co-educational secondary school situated in Richmond, British Columbia, Canada which educates students in grades 8-12. Palmer Secondary School is one of the many schools under the Richmond School District. It is the only school in Richmond to offer the Pre-AP Incentive Program, the ACE-IT plumbing program and, previously, the Palmer Hockey Academy. The Richmond Virtual School is also hosted in the Palmer building.

History 
Robert C. Palmer Junior High School first opened in September 1959 with an enrollment of 769. This school is named after Robert Cecil Palmer, a Richmond resident and magistrate in the provincial court for 22 years. The school suffered a terrible fire on April 10, 1976. The school underwent two renovations in 1978 to recover from the fire. In 1996, the Richmond School District converted all senior (Grade 11 and 12 only) and junior (Grade 9 and 10 only) high schools to full spectrum grade 8 to 12 schools. Palmer officially reopened in May 2000 as a full grade 8 to 12 secondary school.

Motto and Colours 

The school colours, navy blue and powder blue, were chosen in 1959 by the student council. The school's Greek motto, KUDOS, can be translated to "for valour" or "for honour" and it is a part of the school's crest designed by the first art department.

Palmer Griffins 
The Griffin represents the Palmer family and is a part of the Palmer Family coat of arms. It is a mythological creature that is a hybrid of both lion and eagle. Griffins are a symbol of wisdom, strength, and loyalty. The Palmer Griffin name is often used for Palmer's athletic teams.

Curriculum and Programs 
Robert Cecil Palmer Secondary School utilizes the full-year linear system. The school year is divided into 3 terms. Students take a minimum of 6 courses to a maximum of 8 courses for the full year; students attend four 75-minute classes on one day and another four different classes the next day. Each week is divided into a rotational basis.

Grading Scale 
Palmer uses the same grading scale as established by the BC Ministry of Education.

For anything less than 49%, students will be assigned an "I" (Incomplete) which will turn into an "F" (Fail) if course requirements are not completed.

Pre-AP/Incentive Program 
Palmer offers honours level courses through its selective Pre-AP/Incentive program. The program develops academic excellence and offers acceleration for subjects in Math, Science, and Socials Students. The Incentive program also challenges students with leadership opportunities, outdoor and physical education, and community service, with the intent of building strong personal character. The Incentive program is established on the basis of promoting a well-rounded education for high school students and to develop learners to think critically.

Entry to the Program is by application, followed by an entrance exam and an interview.

As of 2016–2017, the program offers:
 Enriched (honours) courses in English, Math, Social Studies, and Science
 2 year accelerated track for Grade 8, 9, 10 Math and Science
 Preparation for AP courses and exams in Grade 12
 Trips and outdoor camp experiences to complement Incentive classes
 Leadership and community service opportunities
 Develops personal character

AP Program 
Advanced Placement (AP) courses are offered at RC Palmer Secondary School and are taken by qualified Grade 12 students by selective application. Palmer's AI Code is 821315, as assigned by College Board.

As of 2016–2017, the following five AP courses are offered:

ACE IT Career Prep Program 
The Accelerated Credit Enrolment in Industry Training (ACE IT) program is the in-class component of a high school apprenticeship. ACE IT students are Youth Apprentices registered with the Industry Training Authority (ITA).

ACE IT programs are usually offered as partnerships between school districts and post-secondary institutions with onsite training at either location. Students who successfully complete the ACE IT program earn credit towards both high school graduation and a post-secondary credential. Enrolment in the ACE IT program is free.

Palmer is the only school in Richmond that houses the Plumbing Program for the ACE IT program.

Independent Studies Program 
Independent Directed Studies (IDS), co-operated with the Richmond Virtual School, under teacher supervision, allow students to initiate their own learning on a subject of choice and earn credits towards graduation. Students must submit an IDS application and have previously shown independent work abilities and excellent work ethics to enroll in the course.

Collaboration Day Schedule 
RC Palmer Secondary School has been working with the Collaboration Time late start model for a number of years. Currently, Palmer Staff meet in groups on the first Tuesday of every month for 75 minutes to work on initiatives related to enhancing student achievement and engagement.

Reading Block 
Palmer dedicates 90 minutes of time per week tied to the third block of the day. This 18 minute period is intended to support sustained reading in an area or on a topic that interests the student. The goal is to provide a regular consistent environment that encourages students to pursue reading for pleasure. Access to a variety of topics and authors as well as a variety of strategies is important to developing engaged readers.

Athletics 
Palmer competes in the RSSAA (Richmond Secondary School Athletic Association) with other schools in the School District No.38.

Fall

Winter

Spring

Intramurals 
The intramural program is an opportunity given to all students, regardless of skill level, to participate in an athletic activity. The intramural games occur during lunch time, where students participate in a variety of activities in the gymnasium. The activities are open to all students and the intramural season runs for about a month long, concluding with playoffs.

Intramural sports offered include:

Basketball Team 
The school hosts a basketball program for students that replaces the regular P.E. course with an all-basketball program and teaches the fundamentals, tricks, and plays of the sport. In 2007, the senior basketball team made it to the 63rd Annual Telus-BCHSBBA Boys Provincial Basketball Championships, held in the PNE Agrodome. In 2011, they won the Provincial Championships at the Langley Events Centre.

Athletic Achievements 
British Columbia Provincial Champions:

Lower Mainland Champions:

RSSAA League Champions:

School Excellence

Science Fair Achievements 
Palmer is actively involved in promoting interest in the fields of STEM and research. The school has hosted the Palmer Annual Science Fair (Richmond District) since 2008 and sponsors the 1st place, 2nd place, and, sometimes, 3rd place of the fair to compete in the Greater Vancouver Regional Science Fair.

The school's teams had also won multiple medals at the Canada-Wide Science Fair (CWSF).
 2015, Microcontroller Controlled Laser Area Denial (M-CLAD)
 Gold, Excellence Award – Senior
 Dalhousie University Faculty of Science Entrance Scholarship
 UBC Science (Vancouver) Entrance Award
 University of Manitoba Entrance Scholarship
 University of Ottawa Entrance Scholarship
 Western University Scholarship
 University of New Brunswick Entrance Scholarship
 2014, Concentrated Photovoltaic Thermoelectric Hybrid Systems (C.P.T.H.)
 Bronze, Excellence Award – Intermediate
 Western University Scholarship
 2010, A Statistical Approach to the Applications of Fractal Geometry
 Discovery Channel Math Award
 2009, Cancer-Killing Combinations
 Canadian Society for Medical Laboratory Science Award
 The University of Western Ontario Scholarship
 Gold, Health Sciences, Excellence Award – Intermediate

Destination Imagination (DI) Achievements 
Destination Imagination is a volunteer-led, educational non-profit organization that teaches 21st century skills and STEM principles to kindergarten through university level students through creative and collaborative problem-solving challenges. In the past, Palmer has won 1st and 2nd in 2014, 2013, 2010, 2009, and 2006 Destination Imagination British Columbia Provincial Tournament. The team is most notable for their Instant Challenge excellence, which Palmer had earned 2 consecutive gold medals at the Provincial level.

Mathematical Competition Achievements 
Palmer students enrolled in Enriched Math or Pre-Calculus courses are encouraged to take part in the various math contests that occur annually. Palmer also houses a Junior and Senior Math Club which works on math contest problems and promotes interest in math.

Math Challengers:

CEMC Math Competition:

Notable alumni 
 Edison Chen, Hong Kong-based entertainer
 Bobby Singh, Canadian football guard for the Calgary Stampeders and school trustee for School District 38 Richmond
Julie Suronen, United States-based film producer

References

External links 
 Official homepage
 Enrollment Reports

High schools in Richmond, British Columbia
Educational institutions established in 1959
1959 establishments in British Columbia